Ken Cheng, is a British-born Chinese professional poker player and comedian noted for reaching the final of the 2015 BBC New Comedy Awards.

Cheng studied mathematics at Homerton College, University of Cambridge but dropped out to become a professional poker player.

He wrote and performed for the Cambridge Footlights, often known to refer to himself as a 'footlights regular', and he has also taken his stand-up performances to the Edinburgh Festival. Cheng directed The Footlights International Tour Show 2015: Love Handles, which toured the UK, Paris and North America.

Reviewing the 2015 BBC New Comedy Awards for the comedy news, reviews and listings site Chortle, Steve Bennett stated that Cheng "deserved to win".

On 22 August 2017, Cheng won "Joke of the Fringe".

In September 2017 a Twitter thread insulting the national flag of every country in the world received national media coverage.

His great-grandfather was academic and playwright Hsiung Shih-I.

References

External links
YouTube channel
Camdram page
Twitter account

English stand-up comedians
English male comedians
Alumni of St John's College, Cambridge
Living people
Year of birth missing (living people)